Lieutenant General Aung Soe (born 3 December 1963 in Bassein, Burma) is a former Burmese military officer and general secretary of the Union Solidarity and Development Party, the Burmese military's proxy political party.

Military career 
Htun Aung graduated from the 26th batch of the Defence Services Academy. He previously served as commander of Bureau of Special Operations (BSO) No. 4 and commanded operations in Kayin State after the 2021 Myanmar coup d'état. During the Thein Sein and Aung San Suu Kyi administrations, he served as deputy minister for home affairs. In October 2022, he retired from the Burmese armed forces to become general secretary for the Union Solidarity and Development Party. He has been sanctioned by the governments of the European Union, Canada and the United States for human rights violations.

See also 

 2021 Myanmar coup d'état
 State Administration Council
 Tatmadaw

References 

Living people
Burmese generals
Defence Services Academy alumni
1963 births
People from Ayeyarwady Region
Union Solidarity and Development Party politicians